Ivan Koreta (born 15 October 1955) is a Ugandan military officer, diplomat and legislator. He is a General in the Uganda People's Defence Forces (UPDF) and a representative for the armed forces in the Parliament of Uganda; where he serves as a member of the Public Accounts Committee and the Committee on Presidential Affairs.

Koreta has been a member of the armed forces since 1981 and most recently served as the deputy chief of defence forces, the second-highest position in the UPDF, from 2005 to 2013. He also served from 2006 up until 2009 as the chairman of the General Court Martial, the second-highest military court in Uganda.

Early life and education
Koreta was born in Mbarara, Ankole sub-region, on 15 October 1955 in a Pentecostal family of the Banyankole. He had his primary education at Nyamitanga Muslim Primary School, in his home town of Mbarara and attained his PLE certification in 1969. He then attended Kiira College Butiki for his O-Level education, attaining an East African Certificate of Education in 1973. He then transferred to Old Kampala Secondary School, for his A-Level schooling, graduating there with the East African Advanced Certificate of Education in 1975.

Military training and career
While still in his teens, Koreta attended military training in Mozambique as a member of the Front for National Salvation, a guerilla group led by Yoweri Museveni. He participated in the war that removed Idi Amin from power in 1979. When Museveni formed the National Resistance Army (NRA) in 1981, Koreta joined him. During the Ugandan Bush War, he became a battalion commander in the NRA. During the April 1986 battle to capture the Ugandan capital city Kampala, his 13th NRA Battalion was responsible for guarding the Kampala-Gulu highway at Matugga.

Since the NRA captured power and was subsequently transformed into the UPDF, Koreta has served in various roles, including the following:

 Commander of the First Division: 1986-1988 (at the rank of Brigadier General)
 Deputy Director of the Internal Security Organization: 1988-2001
 Promoted to rank of Major General: 2001
 Promoted to rank of lieutenant general and appointed commandant of the Uganda Senior Command and Staff College at Kimaka, being the first military officer to serve in that capacity: 2004
 Appointed deputy commander of defence forces in Uganda: 2005
 Appointed chairman of the General Court Martial: 2006
 Appointed head of the Ugandan delegation on the Ceasefire and Transitional Security Arrangement Monitoring Mechanism (CTSAMM) team for South Sudan: 2015

Other responsibilities
As a diplomat, Koreta led a Ugandan peace-keeping force to Liberia in 1994. In 2016, he was elected as a representative for the UPDF in the 10th Parliament of Uganda; where he now serves as a member of the Public Accounts Committee and the Committee on Presidential Affairs.

In February 2019 he was promoted from the rank of Lieutenant General to that of a Four-star General, as a part of a promotions exercise involving over 2,000 men and women of the UPDF.

Retirement
In August 2021, he retired from the UPDF, at the rank of a 4-star general, at the age of 65 years.

See also
UPDF
Parliament of Uganda
Salim Saleh
Mugisha Muntu
Jeje Odongo
James Kazini
Aronda Nyakairima
Charles Angina

References

External links
 Partial List of Senior UPDF Commanders
Website of the Parliament of Uganda

1955 births
Living people
Ankole people
People from Mbarara
Ugandan military personnel
Members of the Parliament of Uganda
University of Ibadan alumni
People from Western Region, Uganda
Ugandan generals
21st-century Ugandan politicians
People educated at Kiira College Butiki